Mihail Cerchez Cristodulo (1839–1885) was a Romanian general.

Biography
Descended from an old Moldavian family, Cerchez was colonel in the Romanian Army during the Romanian War of Independence (1877–1878), and fought at the Siege of Pleven and the battles of Smârdan and Vidin.

Cerchez gained fame for being the officer to whom Osman Pasha surrendered and gave his sword on 28 November 1877 at Pleven.

He is buried at Eternitatea cemetery in Iași, next to World War II General Radu Korne.

Legacy
The 85th Logistics Support Battalion for the 8th Mixed Artillery Brigade was named General Mihail Cerchez.

As a gratitude for his efforts toward the independence of Bulgaria, the Bulgarian people built a bust of him in the Romanian Soldier Mausoleum at Grivitsa.

References

1839 births
1885 deaths
19th-century Romanian people
People of the Principality of Moldavia
Romanian military personnel of the Russo-Turkish War (1877–1878)
Romanian people of Armenian descent
People from Bârlad
Burials at Eternitatea cemetery
Romanian people of Circassian descent